The 2000 Women's Eye Group World Open Squash Championship was the women's edition of the 2000 World Open, which serves as the individual world championship for squash players. The event took place in Edinburgh in Scotland from 11 November until 17 November 2000. Carol Owens won the World Open title, defeating Leilani Joyce in the final.

Seeds

Draw and results

Notes
Cassie Campion was unable to defend her title due to injury. 
The new world champion Carol Owens would switch nationality the following year.

See also
World Open

References

External links
 

2000 in squash
World Squash Championships
2000 in Scottish sport
Squash tournaments in the United Kingdom
Squash in Scotland
2000 in women's squash
International sports competitions in Edinburgh
2000s in Edinburgh